Jayant Raj Kushwaha is an Indian politician, Member of Legislative Assembly from the Amarpur (Vidhan Sabha constituency) of Bihar, and Minister of Rural Work in the Government of Bihar. In the 2020 election, he defeated Jitendra Singh of the Indian National Congress. While Raj secured 33.13% of votes polled, Singh, the runner up, finished with 31.23% of the votes. Raj is a member of Janata Dal (United), the ruling party of Bihar. 

Raj is the son of former Member of Legislative Assembly Janardan Manjhi who earlier represented the same electoral constituency of Amarpur. He completed his schooling from C N D High School Baunsi Banka, Bachelor of Business Administration from Marwari College, Bhagalpur, Tilka Manjhi Bhagalpur University in 2010.

Nitish kumar trusted him with ministerial post despite him being a first time MLA, Nitish even came to his defense when the minister was being questioned on his work by BJP MLAs.

References

Janata Dal (United) politicians
Living people
Year of birth missing (living people)
Tilka Manjhi Bhagalpur University alumni